The Missouri Lumber and Mining Company  (MLM) was a large timber corporation with headquarters and primary operations in southeast Missouri. The company was formed by Pennsylvania lumbermen who were eager to exploit the untapped timber resources of the Missouri Ozarks to supply lumber, primarily used in construction, to meet the demand of U.S. westward expansion. Its primary operations were centered in Grandin, a company town it built starting . The lumber mill there grew to be the largest in the country at the turn of the century and Grandin's population peaked around 2,500 to 3,000. As the timber resources were exhausted, the company had to abandon Grandin around 1910. It continued timber harvesting in other parts of Missouri for another decade. While some of the buildings in Grandin were relocated, many of the remaining buildings were listed on the National Register of Historic Places in 1980 as part of the state's historic preservation plan which considered the MLM a significant technological and economic contributor to Missouri.

Formation
In the 1860s, O.H.P. Williams, who was in the lumber business in Pittsburgh, Pennsylvania and his son-in-law, Elijah Bishop Grandin, who had prospered in the oil business in Tidioute, heard of the valuable timber in the Courtois Hills of Missouri and began purchasing land in Ripley County. They purchased an additional  in Carter County in the 1870s, for an average cost of $1/acre, and joined with two others from Tidioute, John Livingston Grandin (Elija's brother) and Jahu Hunter, a lumber and oilman, to form the company.

In addition to the inexpensive land, the investors thought the generally poor population would be eager to work for the company. They also felt that the milder winters would allow for year-round operation, unlike what they were used to in Pennsylvania. Another factor was proximity to the Great Plains states, a region with an expanding population and few trees.

The Missouri Lumber and Mining Company was incorporated in 1880. All four partners remained in Pennsylvania while John Barber White, a successful Tidioute mill operator, was hired to move to Missouri and run the company as its general manager.

Timberland was also amassed in Shannon, Reynolds, Butler, and Wayne counties. The land included thousands of acres of short-leaf Southern yellow pine as well as smaller amounts of hardwoods. In 1879 and 1880, White was able to buy land at Sheriff's sales for as little as five cents per acre.

The first lumber mill was built on the Black River in Wayne County and named White's Mill after the company's manager. The location is near the current city of Williamsville, Missouri and could mill six million board feet of lumber annually. Lumber had to be moved to the Iron Mountain Railroad depot there first by teamsters with oxcarts and then loaded onto railcard for transport to market.

The company tried for many years to obtain direct rail access to the mill, but Iron Mountain refused to provide it. In 1884, despite owning  of timberland in the county, the mill was never able to utilize its capacity and was closed because of the transportation issue. The mill had had 125 employees who were laid off.

New mill
It identified a desirable mill location and sought the needed rail access. The company made a distribution deal with the Kansas City, Fort Scott and Memphis Railway (KFS&M). The KFS&M had already built a line from Springfield to Thayer in 1882. The railroad agreed to construct an  spur from this line running from Willow Springs, Missouri to MLMs land in the Current River Valley in exchange for a guaranteed minimum amount of lumber shipments. A five-year agreement between the companies in February 1887 specified that MLM would ship all its lumber going west of the Mississippi on the KFS&M or its affiliates. The MLM also agree to have a mill operational by the time the line was complete. The spur, organized as the Current River Railroad was completed in 1888. Later that year, the Cape Girardeau Southwestern Railroad extended a line from the east allowing the mill to more directly supply eastern markets as well.

MLM established an operation ten miles south of White's mill on Toliver Pond. The pond was a flooded  sinkhole which could hold  of logs waiting to be milled. The location, near the upper Little Black River, was connected via river valley to other large timber holdings at Beaver Dam Creek. White's mill was dismantled and moved to the new location. A locomotive was brought to the site from Williamsville where it was dismantled and hauled by ox-teams the final  along with other machinery and enough iron rails to build  of logging railroad. The effort was "unprecedented" and culminated in a $250,000 complex of mills and kilns.

Grandin
Just west of the complex, MLM established the new town of Grandin, named after company founder E.B. Grandin. The company had 175 employees in 1889, including locals and skilled workers such as sawyers recruited from outside the region. This location, an unincorporated private company town was the company headquarters for about twenty years.

The town was planned by a company architect/engineer with a main street that had the company store, a hospital, hotel and other commercial buildings, surrounded by large lawns and decorative landscaping. Residential streets were laid out for up to 1000 houses. Just outside of town were a railway roundhouse, blacksmith and other machine shops. Between the town and the mills on the east was an  lumberyard. The headquarters building was the town's financial center where employees were paid monthly on the tenth. It had a vault and teller booth.

Prosperity

There were six million board feet of lumber in the Grandin yard waiting to be shipped when the railroad arrived in June 1888. Production reached 32 million board feet in 1892 and averaged 60 million annually after 1895. More mills, both saw and planing, were added in 1892 and in 1894 it was asserted, by at least one local newspaper, to be the largest mill (by production) in the country.

MLM used an extensive network of tram railways, built with standard gauge track, 300 log cars and 6 locomotives to move logs to the mill. Using standard gauge allowed the log cars to be transported the final leg to the mill over the Current Railroad tracks. It also floated logs on rivers and streams, primarily the Current River. At Chicopee, the logs were dragged out of the river and loaded onto railcars.

The largest were nearly four feet. All logs were left to soak in Toliver Pond for several days before sawing to remove dirt that would dull saw blades. Logs were brought from the pond to the saws by conveyor. The mills included circular, band, and head saws driven by steam power. In addition to dimensional lumber, the mills produced shingles and lath.

The company marketed its pine as "Beaver Dam Soft Pine", after Beaver Dam Creek, and used a beaver as its trademark. The name became well known throughout the U.S. lumber market. MLM lumber was sold from Ohio westward into the plains states, with most being sold west of the Mississippi; half of its 1901 production went to Kansas City lumber dealers.

In 1890, White became president of the Southern Lumber Manufactures' Association, which worked to negotiate better rates with the railroads, standardize lumber grading and prices. A year later, White moved his office from the company headquarters in Grandin to Kansas City where other big lumber companies were located. White consolidated the region's lumber industry in 1897 as leader of the Missouri Land and Lumber Exchange, a cartel which set production and prices. The company was so powerful that it was able to raise lumber prices ten times in 1899 and control lumber prices nationwide.

The company grew and had approximately 1000 employees in Grandin in 1900, and peaked at 1500 five years later. One out of every six Carter County residents worked for the company. The company recruited skilled workers from other regions of the country that also had large timber operations and used mostly locals for unskilled work.

Smaller operations were located in Hunter (named after founder Jahu Hunter) and Fremont, both located on the Current River Railroad.

Company town

In addition to the headquarters building and other commercial and service structures in Grandin, MLM built homes that it rented to employees with families. Over 475 houses were built, which it rented for $1 per room per month. Many were two-story, with painted weatherboard siding, and gable roofs. These houses were two room-wide, one room-deep rectangular structures, often with front porches and rear lean-tos added.

Single women were housed in a company-owned boarding house, where the company could maintain "its vision of morality". There were also two boarding houses for men. The boarding house rent was $18 per month including meals. Most single men lived in more primitive shacks or cabins that rented for $2 - $2.50 per month. Initially, they were pre-fabricated and transported to Grandin by railcar. Larger homes for company officials and supervisors rented for $5 - $10 monthly.  The company hotel had few guests and was mostly used for employee housing.

MLM's control of all housing in Grandin meant it had significant influence in the company town. It provided assistance to widows of men killed on the job for up to two years in most cases. The company acted to some extent as if the people of Grandin were its dependents. However, its decisions were not made without regard to maintaining profitability.  MLM constructed a sidewalk on the town main street in 1906 to aid commerce in the company stores, but it refused to add sidewalks on residential side streets. The company also built the town's school and was involved in its operation, with company officials usually filling the role of school board president and approving the hiring of teachers and other important decisions. It brought telephone service to the town to improve the company's communications efficiency. A line connected Grandin with the county seat of Centerville. MLM initially refused to allow phones in private homes but later relented. Other amenities provided by the company included a library and churches of various denominations. Church support include paying the salary of the ministers. Various other social organization were supported by the company, such as the Knights of King Arthur, to "promote a healthy and productive workforce". It supported recreation facilities, baseball teams, and even an ice-skating rink.

From around 1890, MLM staffed a small hospital with doctors to maintain the health and productivity of its workers and their families. Funded by a monthly fee ($0.75 for single workers and $1.25 for those with families, collected from each employee), the clinic provided unlimited health care. MLM was a pioneer of company-sponsored health care. The clinic grew to a staff of ten, including a dentist. The company even provided a small mobile health facility, moved on railroad flatcar, to take health care into the work camps in the forest. Serious injuries and deaths were not uncommon, particularly among railroad workers.

Although the majority of positions were held by men, the MLM used many women as stenographers and clerks, putting the company "in the forefront of the feminization of office work" in the 1890s. The company required character references for all workers. Grandin's population peaked at 2,500 to 3,000 people, 1,200 directly employed by MLM.

Decline

The Grandin mill was ranked as the world's largest by capacity in 1900 & 1901, with the ability to produce 75 million board feet per year, although the most it ever produced was just under 66 million in 1901. Production fell rapidly, reaching about 37,000,000 board feet in 1904. A fire in 1905 destroyed a secondary mill, after which the main mill started 24-hour operation, which used 90 rail cars per day of logs.

Over time, it became more difficult to purchase timberland and to cut timber at profitable prices. Land prices increased rapidly when local landowners became aware of the value of their trees. It was important for timberland to be near the railroad as the cost of extending logging tramlines through the difficult terrain was estimated at $1,000 per mile 

Much of the timber in the county was cut with the land being then repurposed for agriculture.  The industry did not manage the forests to support future harvest. Missouri tax law discouraged this as it taxed cut and uncut land at the same rate; it was not profitable to replant and wait decades for a new crop. The land had to be sold after the initial harvest. Except for heightened output during World War II, yearly production in the region declined until the 1960s.

By 1900, there were few trees left near the Grandin mill and operations moved northward. Land acquisitions were primarily in Shannon County. The new owner of the KSF&M, the St. Louis and San Francisco Railway offered a reduced rate for lumber shipped from northwest Shannon County. By 1906, the company began to plan for leaving Grandin. The mill was only operating four days per week in late 1907. Even with SLSF's discounted shipping rate, the shipping costs were still too high to ship logs from Shannon County to Grandin for processing, especially after lumber prices fell during the recession of 1907. With the supply of nearby trees diminishing rapidly over the next several years, the last logs in the area were cut in 1909 and the mill was closed in 1910. The mill and many of the houses in Grandin were moved to the new mill location which became West Eminence.
The last stockholder meeting in Grandin was in September 1910. The company disposed of the remaining homes and lots in Grandin for $50 - $100, most being sold to individuals.

MLM operations continued at West Eminence and Hunter for around another ten years. The company owners also owned timerland in Louisiana, and was considering buying land in the Pacific Northwest, however operations in other states were conducted with different companies including the Louisiana Central Lumber Company and Grandin Coast Lumber Company (of Seattle).  MLM's operations in the state ended in 1919 when it sold the West Eminence mill.

MLM had more deforested land than it could sell and was still disposing of land into the 1930s. At one time, MLM considering donating land to the federal government to establish a national park.

Historic resources

During the period the Missouri Lumber and Mining Company was active in Grandin, it contributed significantly both to the Missouri timber industry and the national economy, employing technology of a state and scale never before seen in the Ozark region. The surviving structures associated with the company in Grandin were listed on the National Register of Historic Places as examples of the theme of technology as outlined in the "Missouri's State Historic Preservation Plan".

The historic resources of the MLM were listed on the National Register in 1980. Included are Toliver Pond and 29 buildings constructed during the company's presence in Grandin between 1888 and 1909. There are 29 buildings, six of which are close together and listed as the Sixth Street Historic District.

The six houses in the historic district are listed under the reference number of the district, while the pond and other 23 buildings are listed under individual numbers. However, all 30 places are described only in the MLM Historic Resources Multiple Property Submission for the thematic nomination; there are no further detailed nomination forms for any of the places.

Sixth Street Historic District
The following houses make up the Sixth Street Historic District:

Map

Notes

Further reading

References

Timber industry
History of Missouri
American companies established in 1880
1940s disestablishments in Missouri
1880 establishments in Missouri
Company towns in Missouri
Histories of cities in Missouri
Former buildings and structures in Missouri
Defunct organizations based in Missouri
Buildings and structures on the National Register of Historic Places in Missouri
Buildings and structures in Carter County, Missouri
National Register of Historic Places in Carter County, Missouri